The Indiana–Michigan State football rivalry is an American college football rivalry between the Indiana Hoosiers and Michigan State Spartans.

History
The Old Brass Spittoon is awarded to the winner of the game. It was first presented in 1950. This tradition was started by class president, Eugene McDermott of Allentown, PA.

Prior to the expansion of the Big Ten in 2011, there were stoppages in the series because the schools were not protected rivals in the rotating conference schedule (note no game in 1971 and 1972, 1979 and 1980, 1999 and 2000, and again in 2009 and 2010).

With the split of the Big Ten into divisions starting in 2011, Indiana and Michigan State were placed in separate divisions but were assigned as "cross-over" rivals, meaning they played each other every year. This arrangement lasted through the 2013 season. After the addition of Maryland and Rutgers into the Big Ten starting in 2014, the subsequent geographical realignment of the divisions placed both Indiana and Michigan State in the Big Ten East, assuring that the rivalry will be renewed annually.

Game results

See also  
 List of NCAA college football rivalry games

Notes

References

College football rivalries in the United States
Indiana Hoosiers football
Michigan State Spartans football
Big Ten Conference rivalries